Steven Reineke (born September 14, 1970) is a conductor, composer, and arranger from Cincinnati, Ohio. He is the Music Director of The New York Pops. He currently resides in New York City.

Biography

Reineke was born in 1970 in Tipp City, Ohio and developed an interest in his musical talents at an early age on the trumpet. At age fifteen, he taught himself how to play the piano. He continued his trumpet studies at Miami University in Oxford, Ohio, receiving two Bachelor of Music degrees with honors in both trumpet performance and music composition.

Career

Steven Reineke has established himself as one of North America's leading conductors of popular music. Mr. Reineke is the Music Director of The New York Pops at Carnegie Hall, Principal Pops Conductor of the National Symphony Orchestra at the John F. Kennedy Center for the Performing Arts, Principal Pops Conductor of the Houston Symphony and Toronto Symphony Orchestra. He previously held the posts of Principal Pops Conductor of the Long Beach and Modesto Symphony Orchestras and Associate Conductor of the Cincinnati Pops Orchestra.

Mr. Reineke is a frequent guest conductor with The Philadelphia Orchestra and has been on the podium with the Boston Pops, The Cleveland Orchestra and the Chicago Symphony Orchestra at Ravinia. His extensive North American conducting appearances include San Francisco, Seattle, Edmonton, Pittsburgh, Vancouver, Ottawa (National Arts Centre), Detroit, Milwaukee and Calgary.

On stage, Mr. Reineke has created programs and collaborated with a range of leading artists from the world's Hip Hop, Broadway, television and rock including: Common, Kendrick Lamar, Nas, Sutton Foster, Megan Hilty, Cheyenne Jackson, Wayne Brady, Peter Frampton and Ben Folds, amongst others.  In 2017 he was featured on National Public Radio's "All Things Considered" leading the National Symphony Orchestra - in a first for the show's 45-year history - performing live music excerpts in between news segments.  In 2018 Reineke led the National Symphony Orchestra with hip hop legend Nas performing his seminal album "Illmatic" on PBS's Great Performances.

As the creator of more than one hundred orchestral arrangements for the Cincinnati Pops Orchestra, Mr. Reineke's work has been performed worldwide, and can be heard on numerous Cincinnati Pops Orchestra recordings on the Telarc label. His symphonic works Celebration Fanfare, Legend of Sleepy Hollow and Casey at the Bat are performed frequently in North America, including performances by the New York Philharmonic and Los Angeles Philharmonic. His Sun Valley Festival Fanfare was used to commemorate the Sun Valley Summer Symphony's pavilion, and his Festival Te Deum and Swan's Island Sojourn were debuted by the Cincinnati Symphony and Cincinnati Pops Orchestras. His numerous wind ensemble compositions are published by the C.L. Barnhouse Company and are performed by concert bands worldwide.

A native of Ohio, Mr. Reineke is a graduate of Miami University of Ohio, where he earned bachelor of music degrees with honors in both trumpet performance and music composition. He currently resides in New York City with his husband Eric Gabbard.

Compositions

References

External links
Reineke at the Contra Costa Wind Symphony
https://www.barnhouse.com/composer/steven-reineke/

1970 births
Living people
American male conductors (music)
Miami University alumni
American male composers
21st-century American composers
Musicians from Cincinnati
People from Tipp City, Ohio
Classical musicians from Ohio
21st-century American conductors (music)
21st-century American male musicians